Sardar Singh is an Indian politician. In 2001 he was minister of family welfare for Uttar Pradesh.

References 

Uttar Pradesh politicians
Living people
Year of birth missing (living people)